Patrick Göbel (born 8 July 1993) is a German professional footballer who plays as a right midfielder or right-back for FSV Zwickau.

Personal life
He is the younger brother of fellow professional footballer Christoph Göbel.

References

External links

1993 births
Living people
Association football midfielders
Association football fullbacks
German footballers
FC Rot-Weiß Erfurt players
FSV Zwickau players
Würzburger Kickers players
Hallescher FC players
KFC Uerdingen 05 players
3. Liga players
People from Heilbad Heiligenstadt
Footballers from Thuringia